The site of ancient settlement at Kanka, Uzbekistan, is located in 80 km southeast of Tashkent, in the southeastern outskirts of the Eltamgali settlement. It is one of the large, ancient city centers of the Tashkent oasis. Kanka is the first capital of the Chach state, a small estate of Kanguy.

Site Description
Monumental fortification walls with towers surround the huge territory of more than 160 hectares. There are three cities inside, located within one another, and each of them has its own fortification, curtains, and ditches. Inside is a small town typical of contemporary city planning, which has a suspension bridge. In its northeast part rises the most powerful construction of the city-citadel-arch, with a height more than 40 meters, with the governor's palace, man-sided bastions, and house temple. The total area is 220 hectares. Kanka divides into three parts: citadel, shakhristan (town territory), and rabad (trade and commercial outskirt).

Citadel is almost square-shaped, and has a height of 35 m. There is a huge castle with four towers at the base of citadel. The castle has been separated from the building by a huge ditch. It stands on the powerful platform, the top part of which has nine lines of pahsa (adobe clay). Inside of the platform, more ancient buildings are concealed. There are buildings of 6th-7th and 11th-12th centuries in the top layer of the citadel. In the center of the northern facade was the only entrance to citadel. A distinctive peculiarity of Kanka is that it has three Shakhristans, the establishment of which reflects the stages of the dynamics of town development.

Shakhristan I includes citadel (in the northwestern edge and it has correct square form of quadrangle stretched to the west from the river. The height of fortification walls from its base is 26 m. Shakhristan I was encompassed by a wide ditch (about 35 m.). The only gate is in the center of the southern side. Evidently, there was a tower, from where a drawbridge was thrown. The depth of the cultural layers is not the uniform, and in the western part, it is 26 m. In the territory of Shakhristan I urban development was found from the 11th - 12th centuries, and ruins of town temples from the 6th - 7th centuries.

Shakhristan II surrounds Shakhristan I from three sides and it has square form too, but it stretches along riverbed. Its total area equals to 45 hectares. It has very compact planning and encompassed with its own fortification wall. Separation of this territory is the result of temporary shortening of urban territory in the beginning of 7th century.

Shakhristan III includes all these parts; its planning nears to trapezium [approximates a trapezoid?]. The total area of the urban territory, surrounded by the stronghold walls, is 160 hectares. It was discovered that there was a terrace and a little ditch in front of the stronghold walls. Southwestern and Central tracts of Shakhristan III have been planned very densely with a street net and bazaar squares. The western and northeastern parts do not have any buildings. There are unique production shops and city caravanserai, which were discovered as well in this part of the settlement.

The rabad encompasses urban territory in a horseshoe shape, from the east and southwest. It is unknown whether stronghold walls have been installed because a large territory of the rabad is ploughed up. The city appeared in the 4th century B.C., and it was identified by the Greek sources with Antihiey Zayaksartskoy. In subsequent centuries it was part of the Kanguy State and was known as a first capital of Chach ("Yuni-Shi",in Chinese sources). The north route of the Great Silk Road ran through it. It was described as Kharashet in Arabic sources (etymological meaning is «the city of holly farna»), a second under the economic and cultural center of Shash in Middle Age.

During the archaeological research on the Kanka site, in the ancient settlement was discovered a palace of the ruler, with a house temple of fire in the citadel. The monumental city temple was discovered in Shahristan I, direct data that is given in Chinese sources. The unique discovered here the remains of monumental lists of temple and type-bull connected with the Manichaean religion. The residential area, industrial workshops, big monumental caravanserai and bazaar squares were discovered in the period of Shahristan III.

History

World Heritage Status
This site was added to the UNESCO World Heritage Tentative List on 18 January 2008, in the Cultural category.

References

Links

Archaeological sites in Uzbekistan
Central Asia
Uzbekistani culture
World Heritage Tentative List